Edward Topping Doane (May 30, 1820 – May 15, 1890) was an American Protestant missionary in Micronesia.

Biography
Doane was born at Tompkinsville, Staten Island, New York on May 30, 1820. He graduated from Illinois College in 1848 and from Union Theological Seminary in 1852.

Doane married Sarah W. Wilbur on May 13, 1854 and they soon became missionaries for the American Board of Commissioners for Foreign Missions. They arrived in Pohnpei on February 6, 1855 and then transferred to Ebon Atoll, Marshall Islands two years later. Doane lost his first wife in 1862 after childbirth complications. He traveled back to the United States and re-married Clara H. Strong in Dundee, Illinois on April 13, 1865.

He and his new wife returned to Pohnpei in 1865. Clara left Pohnpei in 1872 and eventually joined her brother in the Japan Mission. Edward Doane traveled to Japan and found his wife ill. She claimed that she did not want to be married to him so Edward took her to the States and put her in a sanitarium in Illinois. Edward took a position in a small church in Missouri while his wife recovered. Clara persisted in her desire not to reunite with her former husband and they eventually divorced. The Boston Board transferred Edward Doane back to Pohnpei in 1885.

Doane became involved in a dispute between Catholic and Protestant missionaries on Pohnpei. Foreign traders accused Doane of encouraging the Pohnpeians to oppose the German traders and resist Spanish rule. He was arrested on April 13, 1887 for disrespectful behavior. He was deported on June 16 to Manila, Philippines where he soon gained a pardon from Governor General Emilio Terrero and returned to Pohnpei. Doane moved to Honolulu, Hawaii due to his poor health, where he died on May 15, 1890.

References

External links
 

1820 births
1890 deaths
People from Tompkinsville, Staten Island
Illinois College alumni
Union Theological Seminary (New York City) alumni
American Congregationalist missionaries
Congregationalist missionaries in the Federated States of Micronesia
Congregationalist missionaries in the Marshall Islands
American expatriates in the Hawaiian Kingdom